The Thomas Hunt Morgan Medal is awarded by the Genetics Society of America (GSA) for lifetime contributions to the field of genetics.

The medal is named after Thomas Hunt Morgan, the 1933 Nobel Prize winner, who received this award for his work with Drosophila and his "discoveries concerning the role played by the chromosome in heredity."  Morgan recognized that Drosophila, which could be bred quickly and inexpensively, had large quantities of offspring and a short life cycle, would make an excellent organism for genetic studies. His studies of the white-eye mutation and discovery of sex-linked inheritance provided the first experimental evidence that chromosomes are the carriers of genetic information.  Subsequent studies in his laboratory led to the discovery of recombination and the first genetic maps.

In 1981 the GSA established the Thomas Hunt Morgan Medal for lifetime achievement to honor this classical geneticist who was among those who laid the foundation for modern genetics.

Laureates
Source: Genetics Society of America

See also

 List of genetics awards

References

Genetics awards
Awards established in 1981